Free Union of Poland was a German trade unions in Poland, based in the former Prussian territories that were ceded to Poland. The unions were linked to the German Socialist Labour Party in Poland (DSAP). As of 1925, the unions had 13,200 members.

See also
Free Trade Unions (Germany)

References

Trade unions in Poland
National trade union centers of Poland
Second Polish Republic